Jera is a traditional dance popularly performed by the Dagomba people of the Northern region of Ghana.

Gallery

References 

African dances
Ghanaian dances
Upper East Region